In molecular biology, SNORA15 (also known as ACA15) is a member of the H/ACA class of small nucleolar RNA that guide the sites of modification of uridines to pseudouridines.

This family also includes the mouse MBI-79 sequence.

References

External links 
 

Small nuclear RNA